Stéphane Mangin is a physicist and professor at the University of Lorraine in Nancy, France. He is head of the Nanomagnetism and Spintronics group at the Institut Jean Lamour, a laboratory jointly run by the CNRS and the University of Lorraine.

His research concerns the study of nanomagnets and their magnetization dynamics under the influence of different stimuli such as a magnetic field, a current pulse which can generate a spin-transfer torque, a spin-orbit torque (see spin-orbit interaction), or an ultrashort pulse laser.

His work has had technological applications to magnetoresistive random-access memory (MRAM) and magnetic data storage on hard disk drives, for example heat-assisted magnetic recording (HAMR) using a laser beam.

Biography 
Stéphane Mangin obtained his PhD thesis in 1997 at the Université Joseph Fourier in Grenoble, France, later becoming a post-doctoral researcher at the Université catholique de Louvain in Belgium. He was an assistant professor at the Henri Poincaré University in Nancy, before promotion to a full professorship in 2008.

He has worked in collaboration with many laboratories all over the world. In 2004–2005, he was an invited researcher at Hitachi GST San Jose Research center California and in 2012–2013, an invited professor at the Center for Magnetic Recording Research in the University of California, San Diego (UCSD). In 2015, he co-founded an International Laboratory on NanoElectronics with Eric Fullerton at UCSD, Dafiné Ravélosona at Paris-Sud University and Andrew Kent at New York University. In 2021-2022, he had been a visiting fellow and professor at Churchill College, University of Cambridge.

Since 2009, he has been the scientific director of project Tube Daνm (Deposit and Analysis of Nanomaterials under Ultra-High Vacuum), a 70-meter-long technological platform, the only such device in the world. This tube allows researchers and companies to work under ultra-high vacuum conditions in order to grow thin film material with new properties, allowing for example future data storage possibilities.

He has organized or co-organized several international conferences and workshops, including the Magnetic Single Nano-Object Workshop and School and the World Materials Forum.

Mangin had actively engaged in interactions between science and the general public, including popularization and mainstream conferences. Between 2013 and 2019, he served on the committee of the "Parliamentary Office for the Evaluation of Scientific and Technological Choices", a French governmental advisory group.

Honors and awards 

 2007: Junior member of the Institut Universitaire de France
 2008: First research prize from the Lorraine region
 2010: President of the local section of Société française de Physique
 2015: Member of the local section of the French Academy of Sciences
 2017: Senior member of the Institut Universitaire de France
 2018: Fellow of the American Physical Society
 2019: President of IEEE Magnetics Society France Chapter
 2021: IEEE Fellow of the Magnetic Society
 2022: Visiting Fellow of Churchill College, Cambridge

References

External links 
 Publications on French open-access repository HAL

Fellows of Churchill College, Cambridge
French physicists
French materials scientists
Living people
1971 births